Cologne is Germany's fourth-largest city and the largest city in the Rhineland. As of 31 December 2011, there were officially 1,017,155 residents. The city is center of the Cologne/Bonn Region with around 3 million inhabitants (including the neighboring cities of Bonn, Hürth, Leverkusen, and Bergisch Gladbach).

Population by district

Population by migration background 

1 largest groups from Italy, Poland and Greece 
2 largest groups from Morocco and Algeria
3 largest group from Iran

Population by age

Historic population data

Roman Cologne 
The walls of Colonia Agrippina covered an area of 96.8 hectares, but the population density within the walls remains uncertain.

Medieval Cologne 

Since the construction of the Medieval wall in 1180, the area of the old imperial city of Cologne has not changed for more than 600 years and was only extended over the old city walls in 1794, just short before the arrival of French troops and Cologne's incorporation into the First French Empire.

Modern Cologne

16th through 19th century 
 

After 1815, the Kingdom of Prussia enforced the construction of fortifications which again hindered any growth for the city. Only with the acquisition of these fortifications in 1881, the city of Cologne had the possibility of a gradual territorial expansion. On 12. November 1883 a strip of territory from parts of the municipalities of Ehrenfeld, Kriel, Longerich, Müngersdorf and Rondorf was added to the city. Since 1886, the Cologne City Council intensified negotiations with the surrounding communities, and on 1 April 1888 ended in a first major incorporation.

20th century 
The territorial expansion, beginning in the late 19th century, were significant marks for the city's population growth. Major communal reorganizations took place in 1910, 1914, 1922 and 1975.

21st century

See also 
 Demographics of the European Union
 Demographics of Germany 
 Demographics of Berlin
 Demographics of Hamburg
 Demographics of Munich

References 

Cologne
History of Cologne
Cologne